This list of selected exhibitions by Federico Díaz includes both group and solo exhibitions.

Group exhibitions 
 1992
Festival International de la Video et des Arts Electroniques, Locarno Lago Maggiore, Switzerland
N.E.C., Videofestival, Tokyo, Japan
 1993
International Contemporary Art Forum, ARCO, Madrid, Spain (February 1993)
Alexander-Dorner-Kreis, Kubus, Hannover, Germany:10 Jahre Festival Video, Gran Canaria, Spain
 1994
Landesgalerie im O.Ö. Landesmuseum Francisco Carolinum, Austria Tabakwerke, Linz, Austria: Netz Europa 9. 9.–16. 10. / 
Munich, Germany: Europa 94, Junge Europäische Kunst in München 10. 9.–20. 10. 
Galerie hlavního města Prahy, Dům U Kamenného zvonu, Prague, CZ: Zvon ’94. Bienále mladého umění 17.12.1994–8.2.1995. / 
 1995 
Výstavní síň Mánes, Prague, CZ: Zkušební provoz / Test Run. Má umění mladé? / Does art have young ones? 25.4.–17.5.1995 / 
Národní galerie v Praze, Valdštejnská jízdárna, Prague, CZ: Orbis Fictus. Nová média v současném umění 30. 11. 1995–1. 1. 1996.
Moravské zemské muzeum, Brno, CZ: Hi-tech / Umění Kunstmuseum Düsseldorf im Ehrenhof, Düsseldorf, Germany, Kunstakademie
 1996 
Richterova vila, Prague, CZ: Respekt – Vzpomínky na budoucnost 19. 6.–7. 7. 1996. 
Dům umění města Brna, Brno, CZ: Hi-tech / Umění 17.10.–30.10.
 1997
Starý královský palác, gotické podlaží, Prague, CZ: Cena Jindřicha Chalupeckého pro rok 1997 – Veronika Bromová, Jiří Černický, Federico Díaz, Roman Franta, Jiří Příhoda 21. 11.–14. 12.
 1998
Galerie hlavního města Prahy, Dům U Zlatého prstenu, Prague, CZ: Současné umění: Contemporary Collection – Czech Art in the ’90s (1998–2000) / . 
Hall des Chars Laiterie, Strasbourg, France:  25. 9.–25. 10. 
Passage de Retz, Paris, France: L’Art du Monde 98 29. 4.–13. 6.
 1999 
Výstavní síň Mánes, Prague, CZ: Neplánované spojení. Stipendisté Nadace Jana a Milan Jelínek 1990–1998 18. 2.–12. 3. 1999 / 
Galerie Rudolfinum, Prague, CZ: Crossings 24. 6.–12. 9.
 2000
Národní galerie v Praze, Palác Kinských, Prague, CZ: Konec světa? / The End of the World? 26. 5.–19. 11. 2000 / 
Pražský hrad, Prague, CZ: ENTERmultimediale 31. 5.–3. 6. 
Dům umění ve Zlíně, Zlín, CZ: II. Zlínský salon mladých 1. 6.–15. 10. / 
Galerie hlavního města Prahy, Městská knihovna, Prague, CZ: Aktuální nekonečno / Actual Infinity 27.9.–30.12.2000 / 
Národní galerie, Sbírka moderního a současného umění, Veletržní palác, Prague, CZ, Proměny řádu: chaos a řád > 8. 9.–6. 11.
 2001 
PAC a Triennale di Milano, Milan, Italy: Milano Europa 2000 19. 5.–16. 9. 2001 / . 
Moravská galerie v Brně, Pražákův palác, Brno, CZ: Možná sdělení 16. 10.–30. 12. 2001 / 
Divadlo Archa (et al.), Prague, CZ: Datatransfer, festival kyberkultury 12. 11.–24. 11. 2001.
 2002
Musée des Beaux-Arts de Nancy, Nancy, France: Corps et traces dans la création tchèque 1962–2002, 9. 9.–18. 11. 2002/ 
Dům umění města Brna, Brno, CZ: Cena J. Chalupeckého, finále: Markéta Baňková, Federico Díaz, Lenka Klodová, Markéta Othová 18. 10. 2002–5. 1. 2003. 
Espace EDF Electra, Paris, France: Lanterna Magika: nouvelles technologies dans l’art tchèque du XXe siècle 26. 10. 2002–19. 1. 2003/ 
 2003
České muzeum výtvarných umění, Prague, CZ: ...o technice.../...about technology... 2. 7.–14. 9. 2003/ 
Landesmuseum Bonn, Galerie der Stadt Remscheid, Bonn, Germany: Aus Liebe. Die Generation der 90er Jahre in Prag 27. 9.–30. 11
Moravská galerie v Brně, Uměleckoprůmyslové muzeum a Místodržitelský palác, Brno, CZ: Ejhle světlo 17. 10. 2003–29. 2. 
Museo de Bellas Artes, Buenos Aires, Argentina, Arte i Cybernetica,1.10- 1.11.
 2004 
Jízdárna Pražského hradu, Prague, CZ: Ejhle světlo 26. 3.–6. 6. 2004/. ; 80-86217-61-2
Galerie kritiků, Prague, CZ: V mezičase / In time between 7. 4.–7. 5
Galerie kritiků, Prague, CZ: Vision, Prague/Tokyo 10. 8.–12. 9. 
Gallery Vision, Gallery Toki, Tokyo, Japan: Vision, Prague/Tokyo (podzim 2004)
ZKM (Zentrum für Kunst und Medientechnologie), Karlsruhe, Germany: Die Algorithmische Revolution 31. 10. 2004–6. 1. 2008.
Galerie Futura, Prague, CZ: Objectually Speaking 10. 12. 2004–6. 2.2005
 2005 
Sumida River Hall, Tokyo and Aichi, Japan: EXPO 2005 25. 3.–25. 9. 
Museum Kampa, Prague, CZ: Com.bi.nacion: Science meets Art 4. 7.–4. 9. 2005/ 
Ars Electronica 2005, Linz, Austria: Hybrid – Living in paradox 1. 9.–6. 9. 2005/ 
Museum Kampa, Prague, CZ: Turbulence 14. 11. 2005–1. 1. 2006.
ZKM (Zentrum für Kunst und Medientechnologie), Karlsruhe, Germany: Lichtkunst aus Kunstlicht 19. 11. 2005–6. 8. 2006.
 2007
City Gallery Prague / Galerie Hlavního Města Prahy, Prague, Space for intuition/Prostor pro intuici > 17. 10. 2007–2. 12. 2007
 2008
Futura, Karlin Studios, Prague, Intro 518 Now 69 Now Now 180 Bonus Q > 
5. 6. - 29. 5. 2008
 2009
Mori Art museum, Tokyo, JP, Ropongi Art Night > 28.3.- 29.3. 2009 
DOX - Centre for contemporary art, Prague, My Europe > 07.10 – 18.11 2009
DOX - Centre for contemporary art, Prague, 14 S - Fourteen artists, fourteen themes > 23. 5. - 16. 8. 2009
 2010
Expo 2010, Shanghai, China > 1.5-30.10.2010
 2011
54th Venice Biennale, Venezia, IT, Federico Díaz : Outside Itself >4.6 -30.9.2011/ 
Galerie Zdeněk Sklenář, Prague, CZ, Krajiná, Karel Malich Federico Díaz Evžen Šimera Jan Martinec, Jonáš Strouhal > 27. 7. - 15. 10. 2011
 2012
Biennial of Art and Technology 06, Itau Cultural, São Paulo, BR, Emoção Art.ficial [Art.ficial Emotion]  30.5. – 29.6.
2015
Pori Art Museum, Pori, Finland, KAREL MALICH & FEDERICO DÍAZ, 06.02.2015 - 24.05.2015

Solo exhibitions 
 1997 
Galerie hlavního města Prahy, Staroměstská radnice, Prague, CZ: Tacuzcanzcan > 29. 5.–20. 7.
 1998  
Galerie Václava Špály, Prague, CZ > Bolb 30. 9.–1. 11.
 1998 
Royal Institute of British Architects (RIBA), London, GB: Introsphere E AREA > 3. 3.–31. 3.
 2000 
Národní galerie, Veletržní palác – Malá dvorana, Prague, CZ: Federico Díaz: E-mpact >13. 12. 2000–18. 2..2001
 2002
Moravská galerie v Brně, Uměleckoprůmyslové muzeum, Brno, CZ: Mnemeg > 15. 11.–15. 12.
 2005 
ICA (Institute of Contemporary Arts), London, GB: Sembion > 28. 2. - 6. 3.
 2006 
Galerie Zdeněk Sklenář, Prague, CZ, Fluid F1 > 15. 2.–1. 4.
 2007  
Galerie Zdeněk Sklenář, Prague, CZ, Resonance >16. 7.–31. 8.
 2008  
Miami Art Basel, Art Positions, PS1/ MoMA, Miami, US : Federico Diaz / Ultra, radio WPS1 MoMA > 3.-8.12.2008/ 
 2009 
Frederieke Taylor Gallery, New York City, US, Adhesion > 15.9 – 17.10 2009 
Galerie Zdenek Sklenar, Prague, CZ, Federico Díaz: Adhesion / Survival Manual / Chapter  > 1.1. - 1 4. 9. - 3. 10. 2009
 2010  
MASS MoCA/ Massachusetts Museum of Contemporary Art, North Adams, US,  Federico Diaz : Geometric Death Frequency 141 > 23.10 2008 – 20. 4 2012/ 
 2011
Galerie Zdenek Sklenar, Prague, CZ, Federico Diaz : Outside Itself > 23. 11. - 24. 12. 2011
 2014
CAFA Museum, Beijing, China, Federico Diaz: You Welded the Ornament of the Times > November 2014

Diaz